Albuquerque Public Schools (APS) is a school district based in Albuquerque, New Mexico. Founded in 1891, APS is the largest of 89 public school districts in the state of New Mexico. In 2010 it had a total of 143 schools with some 95,000 students, making it one of the largest school districts in the United States. APS operates 89 elementary, 27 middle, and 13 high schools, as well as 10 alternative schools. They also own the radio station KANW and co-own the TV stations KNME-TV and KNMD-TV along with the University of New Mexico.

APS serves a majority of Bernalillo County. Exceptions include Barton, the county's portion of Manzano Springs, and a section of Sedillo. APS also includes a portion of Sandoval County, where it serves Corrales.

History

Albuquerque Public Schools was founded in 1891, shortly after the New Mexico Territorial Legislature passed a new public education law authorizing municipalities to establish school boards and sell municipal bonds for school construction. The district acquired its first school by taking over the former Albuquerque Academy at Central and Edith, and classes began that fall. Primary schools were established in each of the city's four political wards in the early 1890s, and a new Central School for the upper grades opened in 1900. In 1911, the district appointed superintendent John Milne, who oversaw the school system until 1956 and was credited with much of its success.

With the city continuing to grow rapidly, a new high school building was constructed in 1914. Critics complained that the school was too large and would never reach its capacity of 500 students, but this proved not to be the case as a second building was required just 13 years later and the campus had grown to five buildings by 1940. In 1923 the district added two junior high schools, Washington and Lincoln, and two elementary schools at the expanding fringes of the city, John Marshall in the south and University Heights in the east. The outdated old ward schools were phased out between 1927 and 1937, to be replaced by Longfellow, Eugene Field, Coronado, and Lew Wallace elementary schools, respectively. The district continued to expand with the city's growth to the east, adding Monte Vista Elementary in 1931, Jefferson Junior High in 1938, and Bandelier Elementary in 1939.
 

Albuquerque's population exploded in the postwar era, and APS had to add new schools continuously to keep up, including the city's second high school, Highland, in 1949. APS also took over the Bernalillo County public school system that same year, bringing in schools in the older rural communities along the Rio Grande valley and in the mountains. Declining enrollments saw several inner-city schools closed in the 1970s, and Albuquerque High moved to a new location farther from Downtown. Nevertheless, the district as a whole continued to grow, and more recent demographic shifts have seen Coronado and Lew Wallace elementary schools reopen. In 1994, five schools in the suburb of Rio Rancho were transferred to the new Rio Rancho Public Schools district. In 2010, APS recorded nearly 100,000 students.

Schools 
As of 2017, APS operates 88 elementary schools (grades K–5), 27 middle schools (grades 6–8) and 13 high schools (grades 9–12). The following list is adapted from the APS website.

High schools

Middle schools

Elementary schools

Alternative schools 
 ABQ Charter Academy
 Amy Biehl Charter School
 Career Enrichment Center
 eCADEMY High School
 Family School
 Freedom High School
 Juvenile Detention Center Educational Unit
 La Academia de Esperanza
 New Futures School
 Nex+Gen Academy (Project-based Learning magnet)
 School On Wheels
 Stronghurst Alternative

Former schools

References

External links 

 Official site

School districts in New Mexico
School districts established in 1891
Education in Albuquerque, New Mexico
Education in Bernalillo County, New Mexico
Education in Sandoval County, New Mexico
1891 establishments in New Mexico Territory